The Hominoid Personality Questionnaire (also: HPQ) is a personality rating instrument used for non-human primates. It is an extended version of the Orangutan Personality Questionnaire, which was an extended version of King and Figueredo's Chimpanzee Personality Questionnaire. The HPQ has been used to assess personality in non-human primate species (e.g. chimpanzees, orangutans, rhesus macaques).

The HPQ contains 54 adjectives followed by a description. Forty-one items were taken from the 75 items of Goldberg's "Big Five". Examples include Dominant, Sympathetic, Helpful, Sensitive, Submissive, Dependent, Independent, Fearful, Decisive, Timid, Cautious, Intelligent, Persistent.

References

Additional reading
 
 
 
 King, J. E., Murray, L., & Weiss, A. D. (2011). Personality and temperament in nonhuman primates. New York : Springer, c2011.
 
 
 
 

Primate anatomy